Lake Meiktila is a lake located near Meiktila, Myanmar. Mone-Dai dam supplies water to the lake. It is divided into two parts, north lake and south lake. It is divided by a bridge across the lake. The lake is an artificial irrigation and water reservoir.

History
In  accordance with  the  old saying "Pond in Taungthamun and Lake in  Meiktila", Taungthaman is the largest pond and Meiktila is the largest  lake in Myanmar. Then King Kutha redammed. After that 17 other Myanmar kings in different  dynasties mended it and it is later  known as "Mingalar Lake ". It is  also said  that the powerful  and  glorious King  Thiridamarthawka was  one of them. Then King Anawrahta of Pagan renovated  it in 414 Burmese year by  the method of modern irrigation. He also  established, in the upper and lower parts of Meiktila Lake, nine Theins (Buddhist ordination hall), nine high hill, nine pools and nine ponds. Later on, his grandson, King Alaungsithu succeeded damming the Meiktila Lake. There are also  24 historical pagodas in and near by the town. Meiktila Lake has been the only water resource  for the residents of Meiktila and for the peasants for about 1000 years.

During the reign of King Swa Saw Ke of Ava, Nga Nyo from Winzinn village was famous for his  wisdom. Later, he became the king's counselor named Winzinn Minnyarzar and later honoured by the king as his counselor concerning his wise knowledge on the statue found on the bank of lake.

Pagoda festival

On the eastern part of Meiktila Lake, King Alaungsithu built the Phaung Daw U Pagoda at the place where his raft halted during his journey. The  pagoda festival is annually held in Myanmar month of Tawthalin. In Meiktila, there are many other famous pagodas such as Shwemyintin Padoda, built by King Thiridamarthawka in the east of the Lake, Nagayon Pagoda by King Narapatisithu and Auntagu Pagoda in the center of the lake.

References

Meiktila